Truly: The Love Songs is the second compilation album by Lionel Richie, released on November 25, 1997. The international version included the tracks "My Destiny", "Don't Wanna Lose You", "Ballerina Girl", "Still in Love", and "Oh No". Many of the tracks included on this album were performed with the Commodores.

Track listing
All romantic love songs by Lionel Richie, unless stated otherwise.

"Hello"
"Penny Lover"
"Three Times a Lady" (The Commodores)
"Just to Be Close to You" (The Commodores)
"Still" (The Commodores)
"Sail On" (The Commodores)
"Easy" (The Commodores)
"Endless Love" (Richie/Diana Ross)
"Truly"
"Love Will Conquer All"
"Say You, Say Me"
"Do It to Me"
"Sweet Love" (The Commodores)
"Stuck on You"

International version
"My Destiny"
"Endless Love" (Richie/Diana Ross)
"Three Times a Lady" (The Commodores)
"Don't Wanna Lose You"
"Hello"
"Sail On" (The Commodores)
"Easy" (The Commodores)
"Say You, Say Me"
"Do It to Me"
"Penny Lover"
"Truly"
"Still" (The Commodores)
"Love Will Conquer All"
"Sweet Love" (The Commodores)
"Ballerina Girl"
"Still in Love"
"Oh No" (The Commodores)
"Just to Be Close to You" (The Commodores)
"Stuck on You"

Charts

Certifications

References

1997 compilation albums
Lionel Richie albums
Motown compilation albums